Shift Work are a London-based live electronics band composed of Mark Harris and Johnny Rivo.  Harris was previously a member of Factory Floor.

Shift Work are currently signed to Houndstooth.

Discography

EPs
"Scaled to Fit" 12" (2014), Optimo Music
"Document II" 12" (2015), Houndstooth
"HTH050: Various Artists - Tessellations (2016), Houndstooth

References

English electronic music duos
British industrial music groups
English experimental musical groups
English electronic rock musical groups
Musical groups from London